Pinacotheca was a gallery in Melbourne, Australia.  Established in 1967 by Bruce Pollard, it was ideologically committed to the avant-garde and represented a new generation of artists interested in post-object, conceptual and other non-traditional art forms.

History 
Bruce Pollard opened the Pinacotheca gallery in May 1967, at 1 Fitzroy Street, a dark St Kilda bayside Edwardian mansion.

He relocated it to Bedggood's Shoe Factory,  at 10 Waltham Place, Richmond, Melbourne in June 1970. An early owner of the building was notorious entrepreneur D.J. Henry 'Money' Miller.

The gallery closed in October 1999 and the business was de-registered in 2001, but re-opened in August 2002 for its very last exhibition, then closed permanently.

Ethos 

After the demise of John Reed's Museum of Modern Art Australia in 1966, Pinacotheca became the only gallery in Melbourne showing experimental work in the late 1960s and 1970s, exhibiting works by Art Language artists Ian Burn, Roger Cutforth and Mel Ramsden, and Dale Hickey’s ironic 1969 work in which he commissioned a fencing contractor to install suburban-style fences of unpainted planks around the walls, of different heights tailored to the gallery’s three separate rooms; the first only knee-high, the second intermediate and the third about chin level.

Pinacotheca's exhibitors were in the vanguard of Conceptualism; during The Field, the controversial show of Australian conceptual abstraction that opened the new premises of the National Gallery of Victoria on St Kilda Road, Pinacotheca, then in St Kilda, and concurrently with the NGV show, advertised 'for viewing' 15 of The Field artists in its stockroom alongside a solo by Rollin Schlicht; then in the next year, Joseph Kosuth coordinated the "exhibition" of part of his Second Investigation at several international galleries, each chosen as being adventurous venues showing conceptual art, that included the Pasadena Art Museum, Leo Castelli Gallery (New York), and Pinacotheca. The work was initiated by, and was executed in, Kosuth's request of the gallery directors to advertise his Second Investigation in newspapers, with any further action being left to them. Bruce Pollard placed Kosuth’s statements as advertisements in national newspapers, including The Age, The Sun News-Pictorial and Newsday from his own funds.

Pinacotheca's avant-garde stance was paralleled only by Sydney's Inhibodress and Watters galleries, and indeed in 1977 a show Watters at Pinacotheca, during 4–28 May, showed Suzanna Archer, John Armstrong, George Barker, Jenny Barwell, Vivienne Binns, Hilary Burns, Tim Burns, James Clifford, Tony Coleing, Aleks Danko, John Delacour, Helen Eager, Jeanne Eager, Stephen Earle, Marr Grounds, Adrian Hall, Ian Howard, Noel Hutchison, Robert Jenyns, Ron Lambert, Richard Larter, Bruce Latimer, Frank Littler, Bridgid McLean, Marie McMahon, Patricia Moylan, Chris O'Doherty, Robert Parr, John Peart, Geoffrey Proud, David Rankin, Jon Rhodes, Ken Searle, Imants Tillers, Tony Tuckson, Vicki Varvaressos, Robin Wallace-Crabbe, and Max Watters. In 1984 David Thomas described the work exhibited at Pinacotheca, Watters and Inhibodress:

Its spacious accommodation in Richmond was in impression not unlike a New York SoHo loft, and supported a similar sensibility;

...a large concrete expanse, broken by scrubbed wooden pillars lay beyond the forbidding metal door. It was austerity and doggedness in timber, bricks and mortar, the aesthetic was primitive and cool, the art work was stripped of anything reassuring, and if the lights were off the visitor was expected to turn them on...Clive Murray White described the aesthetic of the gallery as having the "air of New York: if you took a photograph of your work, it would look like a major international avant-garde show." Jonathon Sweet.

Its ambience was described by Ailsa O'Connor in a 1977 review as "austere, almost dungeon like", but it was well suited to the display of large works by Peter Booth, Dale Hickey, Robert Hunter and Robert Rooney who were some of the first artists represented there, in a group exhibition.

In 1971–72 the gallery operated as an artists' cooperative of around twenty, including Robert Hunter, Bill Anderson, Jonas Balsaitis, Peter Booth, Dale Hickey, Simon Klose and Robert Rooney, while Pollard was travelling overseas. During this period Mike Brown, Kevin Mortenson and Russell Drever, with numbers of others held the Dada-ist happening The Opening Leg Show Party-Bizarre. Patrick McCaughey, The Age art critic, described it as "more or less, according to taste, than clean good fun"

Pollard's early attitude to representing women artists was exposed in 1975 when Kiffy Rubbo, curator (1971–1979) at the avant-garde George Paton/Ewing Gallery asked Lesley Dumbrell to escort Lucy Lippard, a feminist critic of Pop Art and Minimalism who was then visiting from the United States as part of celebrations for International Women’s Year. They visited galleries including Pinacotheca. When Pollard invited Lippard to view the stock room, she explained she was interested only in seeing women artists and he was unable to show her any. Pollard took umbrage and Lippard walked out, after berating him.

Exhibitions
Over its 33-year history, more than 300 artists showed at Pinacotheca, including significant and challenging art by Australians Rosalie Gascoigne, James Gleeson, Bill Henson, Tim Johnson, Tony Tuckson and Stelarc.  Ti Parks was the last artist to show there in August 2002.

An example of the often hermetic austerity of some exhibitions was Hunter's 1970 solo show for which he stencilled 11 grids onto the gallery's walls with grey paint, explaining later that : "I want to make something alien - alien to myself" and described his intention to avoid the creation of objets d'art. As minimal and more cryptic still, conceptually, was Robert Rooney/Simon Klose (Collaboration), from 10–20 August 1972, consisting of banks of deadpan photographic prints of urban landscape and interiors, with bluestone pitchers installed in grids on the gallery floor. Critic Patrick McCaughey, announced it a symptom of ‘the demise of the avant-garde into the easy, the predictable, the familiar,’ while Alan McCulloch reported that it was 'Everything or Perhaps Nothing.' They were unaware that the defiant conceptual premise of the show was Klose's proposition that the pair should each produce work for the other—in the other's style and presenting it as theirs—and yet reveal the fact to no-one, even the critics, when questioned by visitors to the gallery, bar a few intimate friends.

Selected exhibitions
In an anti-establishment gesture, documentation and catalogues were deliberately kept to a minimum and consequently parts of Pinacotheca's exhibition history is limited and some dates of shows are only approximate, while precise details are being assembled by Trevor Fuller, custodian and convenor of the Pinacotheca archive project.

References

Modern art museums
Art museums and galleries in Melbourne
Postmodernism
Conceptual art
1967 establishments in Australia
2002 disestablishments in Australia
Art galleries established in 1967
Art galleries disestablished in 2002
History of Melbourne
Australian art
Avant-garde art